The Day the World Came to Town: 9/11 in Gander, Newfoundland is a 2002 oral history of the small town of Gander, Newfoundland and Labrador, Canada in the wake of the September 11 attacks written by journalist Jim DeFede It is the first book authored by DeFede.

Background

In 2001, Gander International Airport played an integral role in world aviation in the hours immediately following the September 11 attacks when all of North America's airspace was closed by Transport Canada and the United States Federal Aviation Administration (FAA). As part of Operation Yellow Ribbon, 42 planes were diverted to Gander. DeFede moved to Gander for two months after the September 11 Attacks to research the story.

Synopsis

The Day the World Came to Town opens with a history of the town and an explanation of the strategic military and commercial importance of Gander International Airport. On September 11, DeFede reports that Gander, with a population of approximately 10,000, accepted 38 previously unscheduled planes carrying approximately 6,800 passengers and crew, most of which were stranded there until U.S. airspace reopened nearly a week later.

From The Newport Beach Independent:
"In what is, I’m sure, one of the few truly uplifting volumes about 9/11, we meet the ordinary folks, who on a moments notice transformed their town into a giant shelter to welcome the “plane people.”

Ganderites offered their cars, food, showers, and beds to the strangers who would soon become honorary “Newfies.”

Reception

DeFede won the 2003 Christopher Award for his work on The Day the World Came to Town.

References

External links
Jim DeFede biography on CBS Miami
Jim DeFede on Twitter

HarperCollins books
2003 non-fiction books
Books about the September 11 attacks
Books about Canada
Books about Newfoundland and Labrador